Myrmecoclytus is a genus of beetles in the family Cerambycidae, containing the following species:

 Myrmecoclytus affinis Breuning, 1975
 Myrmecoclytus mayottei Breuning, 1957
 Myrmecoclytus natalensis Hunt & Breuning, 1957
 Myrmecoclytus pauliani Breuning, 1957
 Myrmecoclytus raffrayi Fairmaire, 1895
 Myrmecoclytus singularis Breuning, 1957
 Myrmecoclytus vadoni Breuning, 1957

References

Acanthocinini